Chotto Jigyasa is a 1968 film directed by the Bengali film director Hrisikesh Mukherjee. This was Prosenjit Chatterjee's first role as a child.

Cast

 Biswajit Chatterjee
 Prosenjit Chatterjee
 Haradhan Bandopadhyay
 Gita Dey
 Anup Kumar (actor)
 Gyanesh Mukherjee
 Madhabi Mukherjee
 Suruchi Sengupta
 Prasad Mukherjee

Plot
This movie of the late 1960s is a rather modern approach to love and family.

After endearing cancer for years, Bumba (Prosenjit Chatterjee) loses his mother. His father, Subimal (Biswajit Chatterjee), struggles grieving his wife's death and trying to explain the concept of death to a kindergartener.

Bumba, unable to come to terms with life without his mother finds ways to reach his mother like writing a letter and tying it to a balloon so it would reach heaven, asking to buy tickets to heaven. Bumba overhears his nanny talking about going to the temple  to pray to "Maa" (goddess Durga) and goes with her thinking his mother now lives there.

In  Dakshineswar  Kali temple, he sees (Madhabi Mukherjee), a woman being referred to as Maa by children begging for alms, He believed her to be his mother. And follows her around. After being referred to as "maa" multiple times she softens up and decides to take her home for his safety. Over the course of few hours they develop a mother-son attachment until Subimal's "Missing Son" is announced in the All India Radio and her family responds.

Eventually the woman's sorrowful life is revealed: her husband and two-year-old son died in a tragic accident. With time, Subimal falls deeply in love with her and expresses it. She confesses how she was afraid of revealing her feelings too, considering how her past would always remain a part of her. Subimal expresses how the past should not be forgotten and thus they decide to give their feelings a chance. Giving a wholesome ending.

References

1986 films